George Oliver Brastow (September 8, 1811 – November 20, 1878) was a Massachusetts businessman and politician who served as a member and President of the Massachusetts Senate, as a member of the Governor's Council, and as the first Mayor of Somerville, Massachusetts.

Military service

Before the American Civil War Brastow was the Captain of Company I of the Somerville Light Infantry of the Massachusetts Volunteer Militia. Brastow commanded the company, for the three months at the beginning of the Civil War, that Company I was federalized and reconstituted as Company B of the 5th Regiment.   Brastow and his regiment fought at the First Battle of Bull Run.

In 1862 Brastow was commissioned a paymaster with the rank of Major.

See also
 88th Massachusetts General Court (1867)
 89th Massachusetts General Court (1868)
 90th Massachusetts General Court (1869)

Notes

1811 births
People of Massachusetts in the American Civil War
Members of the Massachusetts House of Representatives
Members of the Massachusetts Governor's Council
Massachusetts state senators
Presidents of the Massachusetts Senate
Politicians from Somerville, Massachusetts
Mayors of Somerville, Massachusetts
1878 deaths
19th-century American politicians